The Arizona State Sun Devils men's basketball team is the basketball team that represents Arizona State University in Tempe, Arizona, United States. The school's team currently competes in the Pac-12 Conference.

The Arizona State Sun Devils have appeared in the NCAA tournament 17 times, including 3 Elite Eights (1961, 1963, 1975). They have won eight conference championships (four WAC, and four Border Conference) and finished in the final AP rankings seven times. The highest national ranking the Sun Devils have achieved is AP No. 3 under Bobby Hurley during the 2017–18 season and No. 3 under Ned Wulk during the 1980–81 season when the starting lineup included future NBA stars Byron Scott, Fat Lever, and Alton Lister.

38 ASU Sun Devils have been selected in the NBA draft, including ten-time NBA All-Star James Harden, Byron Scott, Isaac Austin, Lafayette Lever, Alton Lister, Lionel Hollins, Sam Williams, Jeff Pendergraph, Mario Bennett, Tommy Smith, Ike Diogu, Eddie House, Freddie Lewis, and Joe Caldwell.

History

Bobby Hurley era
Arizona State is currently led by head coach Bobby Hurley (eight seasons), who replaced Herb Sendek. Sendek was credited for bringing a "basketball atmosphere" and level of excitement to Arizona State that had been absent for years. In his first four seasons at Arizona State, Sendek led the Sun Devils to three consecutive 20 win seasons, the 2009 Pac-10 conference tournament finals, and the second round of the 2009 NCAA tournament and 2014 NCAA tournament. Hurley, in turn, has taken the Sun Devils to the 2018, 2019, and 2023 NCAA Tournaments. 

The Sun Devils earned a 3-seed and first-round bye in the Pac-12 Conference men's basketball tournament and were scheduled to play Washington State when the tournament was canceled due to the COVID-19 pandemic. The 2020 NCAA Division I men's basketball tournament was also canceled due to the pandemic. While the NCAA did not release seedings for the canceled tournament, the Sun Devils were projected by ESPN's Joe Lunardi in his end-of-season "Bracketology" to be a 9-seed. This would have been the first time since 1964 that the Sun Devils had made the tournament in three straight years.

Head coaches

Record vs. Pac-12 opponents
Arizona State has the following all-time series records vs. Pac-12 opponents. The Sun Devils lead three series with conference opponents. (Note: the listed all-time series records include any non-conference matchups).

Postseason results

NCAA tournament results
The Sun Devils have appeared in the NCAA tournament 16* (15) times. Their combined record is 14–17 (12-16). ASU's 1995 NCAA tournament appearance (2 wins, 1 loss) was vacated by the NCAA.

NIT results
The Sun Devils have appeared in the National Invitation Tournament (NIT) 13 times. Their combined record is 7–13.

NAIA tournament results
Arizona State appeared in the NAIA Division I men's basketball tournament twice.  Their combined record is 2–2.

Commissioners' Invitational results
Arizona State appeared in the National Commissioners Invitational Tournament once.  Their overall record is 0–1.

Retired numbers 

Notes

Retired/honored jerseys 
The Sun Devils have retired/honored six jerseys in program history, most recently Ike Diogu's 5 in 2022. Nevertheless, the numbers are active and available for use.

Statistical leaders

References

External links